Nievenheim station is a station in the district of Nievenheim in the town of Dormagen in the German state of North Rhine-Westphalia. It is on the Lower Left Rhine Railway and it is classified by Deutsche Bahn as a category 6 station. The station was opened between 1880 and 1897.

The station is served by line S 11 of the Rhine-Ruhr S-Bahn, running between Düsseldorf Airport and Bergisch Gladbach every 20 minutes during the day.

It is also served by four bus routes operated by StadtBus Dormagen: 884 (at 60 minute intervals), 885 (60), 886 (30) and WE2 (60).

Notes 

Rhine-Ruhr S-Bahn stations
S11 (Rhine-Ruhr S-Bahn)
Railway stations in Germany opened in 1880